The Tain is a fantasy novella by British author China Miéville.

Publication history
It was first published by PS Publishing in 2002, accompanied by an introduction by M. John Harrison. It has since been featured in the 2004 anthology Cities, edited by Peter Crowther, as well as Miéville's 2005 short story collection Looking for Jake.

Plot synopsis

The story follows Sholl, a man living in London soon after a convulsive onslaught by unearthly beings. Through introspective monologue on both sides of the fight, the reader learns of the history of the attacking imagos and "vampires", and the reasons behind the invasion.

Reception

Infinity Plus describes it as "a story which uses the tropes of the fantastic to address the real world's injustices", and compares it to the work of Lucius Shepard."

Bookotron reviewed it:

Aaron Hughes reviewed the book for Fantastic Reviews:

References

External links

2002 British novels
British fantasy novels
British novellas
Novels by China Miéville
Novels set in London
PS Publishing books